Felton Presbyterian Church is a moderately sized church located in Felton, California.

History of the church
In June 1891, the first board of trustees was elected. The Rev. Alex Eakin was chairman of the meetings that followed when it was decided to build a church and call it the First Presbyterian Church of Felton. That first church, dedicated in June 1893, was built at a cost of $1100 at the corner of Gushee and Felton Empire Road. It was constructed in a traditional, New England style. The little church served the congregation for 62 years. The original building,  listed on the National Register of Historic Places, was then used as the Felton Public Library from 1955 to 2019, prior to the 2020 opening of the new Felton Public Library building.

Current building
The present church building on Highway 9 in south Felton was dedicated on January 2, 1955. Don Kint of Felton, acted as foreman, hiring a few carpenters and arranging for a steady stream of volunteers. According to Mr. Kint's memoirs, "At the present time such a project would be almost impossible. Not only because of the cost but because of building permits, county, state and church restrictions. One final word, the temporary wall that contains three (stained glass) windows is where the sanctuary was supposed to be. We are using the social hall as a sanctuary now. I wonder how soon there will enough faith to finish the church building. God will supply the money."

In 1961, members of the church realized that differences resulting from denominational philosophy were irreconcilable. After much deliberation, a group of members split off to form the Evangelical Free Church of Felton, now known as Felton Bible Church. The two churches now enjoy a renewed relationship between members, especially the youth groups. In 1969, Wee Kirk Church of Ben Lomond, united with First Presbyterian Church of Felton to become the United Presbyterian Church of Felton. The brass cross of Wee Kirk was placed over the redwood cross of Felton Church in the Sanctuary as a sign of their uniting. In 1987 the session members voted to change the name one more time to Felton Presbyterian Church.

Felton Presbyterian Church celebrated its 100th Anniversary in June 1993.

List of pastors 

 Alex Eakin 1891-1892
 Richard J. Campbell 1892-1894
 C.R. Nugent 1895-1896
 George R. Bird 1897-1898
 David F. Taylor 1899-1914
 J.W. Atkinson 1914-1915
 R.B. Hummel 1915-1916
 Edward J. Walker 1916-1927
 J.E. Delmarter Sr. 1928-1929
 J.E. Delmarter Jr. 1930-1934
 P. Forey 1934-1935
 Vernon Brown 1936-1937
 Ernest Israel 1937-1939
 W.P. Miles 1939-1942
 Henery J. McCall 1943-1945
 Don Allen 1945-1947
 Carrol B. Pederson 1947-1952
 G. Winfield Blount 1952-1958
 William B. Burke 1958-1965
 Don Munro 1965-1985
 Douglas Crocker 1986-1996
 Steven P. Moyer 1997-2001
 Edward R. Snedeker 2003–present

References

External links
 Felton Presbyterian Church website

Presbyterian churches in California
Buildings and structures in Santa Cruz County, California